Listed below are the managers in the history of Trabzonspor.

List

References

Trabzonspor